The Rutherford Memorial Medal is an award for research in the fields of physics and chemistry by the Royal Society of Canada. It was dedicated to the memory of Ernest Rutherford. It is awarded once for physics and once for chemistry each year, "for outstanding research", when there is a suitable candidate.

Recipients
Source:   Royal Society of Canada

Chemistry

 2020 : Erin Johnson
 2019 : Dwight Seferos
 2018 : Tomislav Friscic
 2017 : Zhongwei Chen
 2016 : Curtis Berlinguette
 2015 : Robert Campbell
 2014 : Paul Ayers
 2013 : Mark J. Maclachlan
 2012 : 
 2011 : Federico Rosei
 2010 : Andrei Yudin
 2009 : Dennis Hall and Keith Fagnou (posthumously)
 2008 : Peter Tieleman
 2007 : Gregory D. Scholes
 2006 : Molly Shoichet
 2005 : Jillian M. Buriak
 2004 : Andrew Woolley
 2003 : Liang Li
 2002 : 
 2001 : 
 2000 : Suning Wang
 1999 : Daniel D. M. Wayner
 1998 : Benoît Roux
 1997 : R. J. Dwayne Miller
 1996 : 
 1995 : 
 1994 : Mark Lautens
 1993 : 
 1992 : James D. Wuest
 1991 : Robert H. Morris
 1990 : 
 1989 : Peter Hackett
 1988 : 
 1987 : Grenfell N. Patey
 1986 : David Griller
 1985 : Stephen C. Wallace
 1984 : Robert J. LeRoy
 1983 : Juan C. Scaiano
 1982 : Geoffrey Ozin
 1981 : Diethard K. Böhme
 1980 : G. Michael Bancroft

Physics

 2020 :  Jens Dilling
 2019 : Paul François
 2018 : Alexandre Blais
 2017 : Ingrid Stairs
 2016 : François Légaré
 2015 : Aashish Clerk
 2014 : Sara Ellison
 2013 : Ray Jayawardhana
 2012 : Guy Moore
 2011 : Freddy A. Cachazo
 2010 : Kari Dalnoki-Veress
 2009 : Barth Netterfield
 2007 : Victoria Michelle Kaspi
 2006 : Aephraim M. Steinberg
 2005 : Peter Grütter
 2004 : Sajeev John 
 2003 : Misha Ivanov
 2002 : Christopher Thompson
 2001 : Matthew W. Choptuik
 2000 : Jerry X. Mitrovica
 1999 : Robert A. Wolkow
 1998 : Martin Grant
 1997 : Nicholas Kaiser
 1996 : Pekka K. Sinervo
 1995 : David B. MacFarlane
 1994 : Michael L.W. Thewalt
 1993 : John W. Hepburn
 1992 : François Wesemael
 1991 : Ian K. Affleck 
 1990 : Scott Tremaine
 1989 : Nathan Isgur 
 1988 : Claude Leroy
 1987 : A. John Berlinsky
 1986 : William J.L. Buyers
 1985 : John J. Simpson
 1984 : Penny G. Estabrooks
 1983 : David J. Rowe
 1982 : William G. Unruh
 1981 : John C. Hardy 
 1980 : Malcolm J. Stott

See also
 List of chemistry awards
 List of physics awards
 List of prizes named after people

References

External links
RSC Rutherford Memorial Medal

Canadian science and technology awards
Royal Society of Canada
Awards established in 1980
Chemistry awards
Physics awards